Albert Lippert  (1901-1978) was a German stage, television and film actor. He was the manager of the Deutsches Schauspielhaus between 1948 and 1955.

Selected filmography
 Cruiser Emden (1932)
 A Prussian Love Story (1938)
 Liberated Hands (1939)
 Police Report (1939)
 Alarm at Station III (1939)
 Twilight (1940)
 The Rothschilds (1940)
 The Girl from Barnhelm (1940)
 The Red Terror (1942)
 Doctor Crippen (1942)
 Tonelli (1943)
 Orient Express (1944)

External links

1901 births
1978 deaths
German male film actors
German male stage actors
German male television actors
People from Oldenburg (city)
20th-century German male actors